Who are the Guilty is a report published by political scientist Rajni Kothari of Delhi-based organisation People's Union For Civil Liberties and Gobinda Mukhoty of People's Union for Democratic Rights. 
The report was issued in November 1984 after conducting investigations into widespread murder, looting and rioting during the 1984 Sikh genocide.

External links
http://www.sacw.net/aii/WhoaretheGuilty.html Who are the guilty] Old link had died.
Who are the guilty  on People's Union For Civil Liberties
Who are the guilty - scanned copy of the second edition issued in December 1984

1984 anti-Sikh riots
1984 documents